The Sault Memorial Gardens was a former ice hockey arena in Sault Ste. Marie, Ontario, for 57 years from 1949 to 2006. It was located in the heart of the downtown district at 169 Queen Street. The Gardens was one of the first Northern Ontario arenas to have artificial ice, and seated 3,990 spectators.

The arena was built as a war memorial, and hosted several teams over the years, but was primarily home to the Sault Ste. Marie Greyhounds of the Ontario Hockey League. The Memorial Gardens was ultimately replaced by the Steelback Centre (now known as GFL Memorial Gardens), built directly adjacent to where the Gardens once stood.

Beginning of an era
On January 7, 1946, the City of Sault Ste. Marie voted to construct a new recreational facility with an arena. It was approved by city residents via questionnaire to replace the then existing Gouin Street Arena. Plans originally intended the facility to be multi-purpose, including an indoor pool, auditorium, and large outdoor fountains. Cost estimates at the outlook of the project were in the range of $400,000 CAD.

The official groundbreaking ceremony took place on September 18, 1946. Work on the massive structure would take two and a half years to complete. Once completed, total costs were approximately $765,000 CAD. The Memorial Gardens officially opened February 20, 1949, with a crowd of 8,500 to mark the official dedication.

About the Gardens
The design of the Gardens' front facade was representative of Streamline Moderne architecture style, using straight lines and curved forms. The main entrance and lobby were on the first floor at street level, and the Greyhounds team offices were on the second floor above. Inside the front doors, the lobby featured cast iron gates through which spectators filed to have their tickets taken. Inside these gates were concessions and entrances to the seating areas.

The seating area had main concourse around the top of arena, and an aisle around the boards at ice level for movement of spectators. The benches for hockey teams, and penalty boxes were located in these aisles. The seats were all wooden benches, painted light blue.

The Gardens had more rows of seats at the ends of the arena, than along the sides. The concourse and seats along the sides, sloped downwards from the end sections, towards the middle sections. As a result of this there were four full sections in the Gardens in which every single seat was tilted on a diagonal angle. The upper concourse area was very narrow, along the sides, and it was also the standing room area.

Memorial Tower
The Gardens' most distinctive feature was the Memorial Tower and red-lighted beacon. The beacon was lit on nights the Greyhounds played home games. The tower was also in commemoration of soldiers who made the ultimate sacrifice during World War II. At the base of the tower, inside the building, stands a list among wreaths, bearing the names of those of Sault Ste. Marie's bravest who did not return. The tower is all that remains from the demolished structure of the Gardens.

Other features
Inside the Gardens, high above the ice at the south end was a memorial fresco featuring stained glass panels and a bronze angel, commemorating the war dead.

The exterior of the south end of the arena had a large Greyhounds logo and a list of all the years that Sault teams had won league championships and the Memorial Cup.

Underneath the stands on the east side, in the corridor beside the Greyhounds dressing room, was the "Greyhounds alumni wall". Every Greyhounds alumnus had his name painted on the wall under the year in which he graduated from the team. The exact wording at the beginning of the list read:

Structural changes
Since its inauguration in 1949, the building has seen some dramatic changes.
 Interior lighting above the ice (1950)
 Acrylic glass around the ice replacing chain link fencing (1952)
 Metal roofing replacing roof shingles (1978)
 Electrical wiring brought up to code (1980s)
 Heating & Ventilation system upgrades (1980s)
 Changeroom renovations (1980s)
 Fire alarm system and Public Address system upgrades (1990)
 Luxury boxes and media gondolas added (1993)
 Exterior refinishing & whitewashing (1997)

End of an era
The last Greyhounds game was played on March 28, 2006, a playoff game versus the London Knights. David Bolland of the London Knights scored the last goal, in game four of the first round playoff series.

The building was officially decommissioned and closed to the public on April 9, 2006 in much the same fashion that it was ceremonially opened. Royal Canadian Legion members and other dignitaries were on hand to bid farewell to an important piece of Northern Ontario, and Sault Ste. Marie's heritage. Demolition of the building's interior began on April 27, 2006, with final exterior demolition beginning May 27, 2006. At the time of demolition, the Sault Memorial Gardens was the second oldest operational arena in the Ontario Hockey League. Only the Windsor Arena was older.

All that remains of the former building is the preserved Memorial Tower, and its beacon. The decision not to demolish the tower, shows its importance to local history, and to remember war veterans. The city block that contains the site of the tower, and the arena facility, is now known as Memorial Square.

Events
The Memorial Gardens played host to the Memorial Cup tournament in 1978 and 1993, as well as the 1979 OHL All-Star Game.

The last big tournament played in the Gardens was the 2003 Air Canada Cup, Canada's national midget hockey championship.

Aside from hockey, the 1990 Labatt Brier, the Canadian men's curling championship, and the 1996 Canadian National Gymnastics Championship were hosted in the Gardens.

Artists that have performed at Memorial Gardens include, Stompin' Tom Connors, Randy Travis, Tom Cochrane, Bob Dylan, Kenny Rogers, Alice Cooper, Billy Ray Cyrus, Rush, The Tragically Hip, Rita MacNeil, Bryan Adams, Johnny Cash, Roy Orbison, Willie Nelson, Helix, Great White, and Honeymoon Suite, among others.  https://www.setlist.fm/search?page=2&query=Sault+Ste+Marie&venue=13d64599

Other larger performances include WWF Wrestling, Smurfs on Ice, and the PharmAssist Skate the Nation Tour.

Photo gallery

Further reading
Cuthbert, Chris, and Russel, Scott. The Rink: Stories From Hockey's Home Towns. .

External links

Memorial Gardens history
OHL Arena Guide profile

Defunct indoor arenas in Canada
Ontario Hockey League arenas
Sports venues in Sault Ste. Marie, Ontario
Streamline Moderne architecture in Canada
Demolished buildings and structures in Ontario
Defunct indoor ice hockey venues in Canada
Sports venues demolished in 2006